Berdoues is a commune in the Gers department in southwestern France.

Geography

Population

Economy
Parfums Berdoues is a French company created by Guillaume Berdoues in 1902. Berdoues is known for its violet fragrance Violettes de Toulouse.

See also
Communes of the Gers department

References

Communes of Gers